An election to Cavan County Council took place on 23 May 2014 as part of that year's Irish local elections. 18 councillors were elected from three electoral divisions by PR-STV voting for a five-year term of office. In addition both Belturbet Town Council and Cavan Town Council were abolished.

Ahead of the 2014 election Cavan was redrawn into three electoral areas, a reduction in one from four, and the number of councillors was reduced to 18, from a previous total of 25.

Fianna Fáil had a good set of elections and only lost one seat overall when compared to 2009. By contrast Fine Gael lost 6 seats and their overall majority. This was one of the few Councils where Sinn Féin did not make gains as the party returned with the same number they had held in 2009.

Results by party

Results by Electoral Area

Bailieborough-Cootehill

Ballyjamesduff

Cavan-Belturbet

References

Post-Election Changes
†Bailieborough-Cootehill Fianna Fáil Councillor Niamh Smyth was elected as a TD for Cavan-Monaghan at the Irish general election, 2016. Sarah O'Reilly was co-opted to fill the vacancy on 15 March 2016. O'Reilly resigned from Fianna Fáil on 7 December 2018 and announced she was joining Peadar Tóibín's new organisation citing disconnect between party membership and the leadership. 
††Cavan-Belturbet Sinn Féin Councillor Eugene Greenan resigned his seat on 26 June 2017. Daniel Downey was co-opted to fill the vacancy on 9 September 2017.

External links
 Official website

2014 Irish local elections
2014